The Nuora is a river in the Sakha Republic (Yakutia), Russia, a right tributary of the Tumara, of the Aldan basin, part of the Lena basin.

The Nuora flows across an area of the Kobyaysky District that is wholly mountainous and desolate. Segyan-Kyuyol village, the closest inhabited place, lies to the south of its confluence with the Tumara. The river is a destination for rafting.
The name of the river comes from the Yakut language.

Course
The Nuora is a mountain river that originates south of the Arctic Circle near the Arkachan Plateau, central part of the southern Verkhoyansk Range. In the uppermost stretch of its course the river flows southwards. As it meets the Kelter Range, it bends roughly southeastwards, flowing below the northeastern slopes of the range within a deep valley. Finally the Nuora meets the right bank of the Tumara River, a little upstream from where it cuts southwards across the Kelter Range,  from its mouth in the Aldan.

Fauna
In the same manner as the upper course of the neighboring Tumara, the Nuora has fast-flowing clear waters fed by rain and snow. Taimen, lenok, whitefish, grayling, pike, ide and perch are found in the waters of the river.

See also
List of rivers of Russia

References

External links
Yakutia.info - Минэкологии Якутии опровергает информацию о рассыпании селитры на реке Нуора (The Ministry of Ecology of Yakutia refutes information about the scattering of saltpeter on the Nuora River)

Rivers of the Sakha Republic
Verkhoyansk Range